Gunnis Creek is a stream in Reynolds County in the U.S. state of Missouri. It is a tributary of Brushy Creek.

A variant name was "Gunnets Creek".  The stream has the name of the local Gunnet family, original owners of the site.

References

Rivers of Reynolds County, Missouri
Rivers of Missouri